Cedric De Zutter (born 27 January 1992) is a Belgian tennis player.

De Zutter has a career high ATP doubles ranking of 913 achieved on 26 August 2013.

De Zutter made his ATP main draw debut at the 2017 Memphis Open in the doubles draw partnering Connor Glennon.

External links

1992 births
Living people
Belgian male tennis players
People from Eeklo
Sportspeople from East Flanders